The Coca-Cola Twelve Hours of Sebring International Grand Prix of Endurance, was the second round of the 1980 IMSA GT Championship and was held at the Sebring International Raceway, on 22 March 1980. Victory overall went to the No. 6 Dick Barbour Racing Porsche 935 driven by John Fitzpatrick and Dick Barbour.

Race results
Class winners in bold.

References

12 Hours of Sebring
12 Hours of Sebring
12 Hours Of Sebring
12 Hours Of Sebring